Little White Dove is a 1973 Chilean dramedy film directed by Raúl Ruiz. It is loosely based on the bestselling 1971 novel Palomita Blanca by Enrique Lafourcade. As a result of the 1973 Chilean coup d'état and military dictatorship (1973–1990), the film was presumed lost for many years and not released until 1992.

Plot 
The film tells the story of Juan Carlos and María, a wealthy and troubled young man and a poor and naive girl, respectively, who fall in love at a hippie concert. The film explores the social differences and political context of the time.

Production 
The film was shot in 1973 over six weeks with a budget of $170,000. It was completed just days before the military coup led by Augusto Pinochet on September 11th, which overthrew the government of Salvador Allende. The film was scheduled for release on September 18th, but never made it to theaters. In October of that year, a private screening was organized for influential critics and representatives of the military dictatorship. Despite assurances that the film would be released, it remained locked away due to its "immoral" content, including nude scenes and strong language.

The film was finally released almost twenty years later in 1992 after being re-edited by Raúl Ruiz. The accompanying soundtrack by Los Jaivas was also released in 1992.

Lost documentary 
During the casting process for the film, a documentary called Palomilla Brava was also being shot. This project was created in response to the behavior of Hugo Ortega, one of the film's investors, who was known to be lecherous towards the female candidates. Raúl Ruiz wanted to expose Ortega's behavior in the documentary, which was intended to provide a critical look at the casting process.

The whereabouts of Palomilla Brava are unknown, as it disappeared along with the original film cans. Sergio Trabucco, the film's producer, has lamented the loss of the documentary as valuable material for understanding the youth of that time.

Cast 
 Beatriz Lapido as María
 Rodrigo Ureta as Juan Carlos
 Bélgica Castro as María's godmother
 Luis Alarcón as María's stepfather
 Manuel Aranguiz
 Maria Castiglione as María's mother
 Mónica Echeverría as Juan Carlos' mother
 Marcial Edwards as Cristián, Juan Carlos' brother
 Felisa González as Telma
 Rodrigo Maturana as María's schoolteacher

Further reading
 López-Vicuña, Ignacio (2017); "Raúl Ruiz's 'lost' Chilean film: Memory and multiplicity in Palomita blanca (1973)" in Ignacio López-Vicuña, Andreea Marinescu (eds.) Raúl Ruiz's Cinema of Inquiry, Wayne State University Press, pp. 159–176.

References

External links

1973 films
1973 comedy-drama films
Chilean comedy-drama films
1990s Spanish-language films
Films directed by Raúl Ruiz